The orange-lined triggerfish (Balistapus undulatus) is a demersal triggerfish.  Although Balistapus is a monotypic genus, it is closely related to the genus Balistoides.

Description
The orange-lined triggerfish has a dark brown to dark green body with orange lines that start behind the head and cover the rest of its body. Their maximum body size is about 30 centimeters. Its body has a stocky appearance, oval shape, and is compressed laterally. The head is large and is about one third of the body length. The mouth is small and terminal and it has strong teeth. 

The first dorsal fin has three spines, one of which is longer and stronger than the other. It is erectile and kept in a dorsal furrow at rest. The second dorsal fin is similar in shape and size to the anal fin, which is symmetrically opposed to it. The pelvic fin is reduced to a ventral protrusion. They also typically have a large block spot by their peduncular spines, and the caudal fin is orange. 

In general, males tend to be larger and lack a concave snout, and also lose the lines on his snout as he matures. Females and juveniles are smaller and have a concave snout.

Distribution and habitat
While other balistoid fishes, such as the filefish and leatherjacks, are typically found all across the Indo-western Pacific, the triggerfish are typically found in coral reefs ecosystems, coral lagoons, and external reef slopes within this area, as well off the coast of East Africa, the Red Sea, and Japan. They tend to stay around their burrows and dens within the reef. Within coral reefs, the orange-lined triggerfish are more versatile than other triggerfish species and can be found at depths up to 50 meters, although studies have found that they prefer depths of 2 to 8 meters. No relationship between the area of the reef and depth has been found in juveniles, and adults were found to vary their depth based on the region; in general, the species was found to have a broad distribution across the reef. There is also a difference between the types of substrata that the adults and juvenile orange-lined triggerfish prefer: the adults were found to prefer rock and branching coral, while the juvenile fish were found to prefer softer surfaces.

Ecological role and feeding

The orange-lined triggerfish is an omnivorous feeder that can, because of its strong and heavy teeth, tackle a variety of benthic prey. Observed food items include cnidarians, molluscs, ctenophores, crustaceans, other fish, algae, and echinoderms. This species in particular, given its broad diet and distribution, is a crucial component in coral reef ecosystems through top-down control and especially through consumption of sea-urchins. The orange-lined triggerfish is a main and dominant predator of the burrowing urchin (Echinometra mathaei) in East African marine parks. Before being protected, the population was overfished, which allowed the burrowing sea urchin population to grow rapidly. In these ecosystems, the burrowing sea urchin affects coral reef health, the presence of other grazers and algae, and erosion. With all three of these influences intertwined, the burrowing sea urchin has the ability to degrade coral reef ecosystems if they are not being controlled by predators, such as the orange-lined triggerfish. When compared to other predators of the burrowing sea urchin in the East African marine parks, the orange-lined triggerfish was found to consume more burrowing sea urchins than others, which exemplifies this species' influence on coral reef ecosystems.

Behaviour
This triggerfish is diurnal, solitary, and territorial. It can be aggressive with other fish. It erects its first dorsal spine to intimidate opponents and predators.

References

External links
 
 

Balistidae
Fish of Palau
Fish described in 1797